Paul Harris is an English choreographer, dance teacher and movement director in film, television and theatre.

His notable works include the famous laser scenes for Catherine Zeta-Jones in the movie Entrapment, the BAFTA Award-winning Bleak House and the wand fight sequences in Harry Potter and the Order of the Phoenix. An interactive hologram of Harris is a permanent feature of the Warner Bros. Studios, Leavesden where Harris is described by Warner Bros. as being "the world's only wand combat choreographer".

In the theatre, he choreographed the 50th-anniversary production of John Osborne's The Entertainer at London's Old Vic. He is also an author of dance books, having written Salsa and Merengue – The Essential Step by Step Guide and several dance syllabi for British awarding bodies in dance. Harris is an acknowledged authority and leading choreographer in historical dance, period dance, tango, salsa, swing dance, ballroom dancing, Latin American dancing and theatre dance. He is the winner of the 2008 Carl Alan Award for choreography.

Early career
Born in St Helens, Harris began dancing at the age of eight and as a dancer, was a successful Juvenile and Junior competitor in ballroom dancing. He won the British Open Championships at the Blackpool Dance Festival in both Ballroom and Latin American dancing, as well becoming 3 times English Champion, United Kingdom, International and West European Champion and placing in the first 3 of every major competition, including the World Championship as an adult.

On turning professional, he studied jazz dance, tap dancing, historical dance and classical ballet and won the British Exhibition (Theatre Arts) title. He retired from competitive dancing to study acting at the Academy of Live and Recorded Arts in London and on graduating, he played leading roles in British television and theatre, including major national tours of three West End productions. His roles during this period included A-Rab in West Side Story, Dill in To Kill a Mockingbird, Edmund in The Lion, the Witch and the Wardrobe, William H. Bonney in Billy The Kid, Scranton Slim in Guys and Dolls and Catsmeat in Snow White with the late Marti Caine.

In the 1990s, he played a role as a Latin American dance champion on the BBC television drama Casualty, for which he choreographed the dance sequences himself. This was spotted by a leading UK dance agent and led to his career in choreography.

As a choreographer
In 1997, Harris was asked to look at a script for a British movie with a view to choreographing the dance sequences. Following a single conversation with the director, he realised that combining his two backgrounds of dancing and acting was the direction in which he should take his career.
Since then, Paul Harris has become one of the UK's most prolific choreographers and dance instructors in film and television. He has also been responsible for the choreography on several big budget movies, including Entrapment, Inkheart, The Other Boleyn Girl, Far From The Madding Crowd, Crooked House and he created the physical language and choreography for the wand-to-wand combat sequences in Harry Potter and the Order of the Phoenix.

Harris has also choreographed many of British television's most highly acclaimed, award-winning dramas of the last decade including Bleak House, The Way We Live Now, To the Ends of the Earth, Jane Eyre, Poirot, A Touch of Frost, William and Mary and six years as the choreographer for the hit UK comedy My Family starring Robert Lindsay. This led to Lindsay requesting that Harris be the choreographer of the 2007 critically acclaimed revival of John Osborne's The Entertainer. Other notable credits in theatre include being the choreographer of "Liberty", the first co-production of Shakespeare's Globe theatre and being a guest dance tutor for the Royal Shakespeare Company on Two Gentlemen of Verona, as well as choreographing productions such as A Family Affair, The Rivals, As You Like It and David Copperfield. He has continued to choreograph for television during this time, including dramas like Lost in Austen, Da Vinci's Demons and Call The Midwife.

Harris co-choreographed Disney's The Cheetah Girls 2 with its director Kenny Ortega, having been brought in at Ortega's request, specifically to choreograph the tango sequence which was shot in Barcelona. The tango Harris choreographed, was described by Ortega in a Dcom Extra interview, as "the most exciting and demanding dance sequence he had ever shot". Other notable directors he has worked with are Jon Amiel and David Yates, with whom Harris has worked four times. Among the notable actors Harris has created choreography for are Catherine Zeta-Jones, Scarlett Johansson, Gary Oldman, Sam Neill, Natalie Portman, Helena Bonham Carter and Ralph Fiennes.

Teaching

As a dance teacher, Harris has devised the dance module of the BA Hons (Acting) and MA (Acting)at four London drama schools. He is a dance tutor at The Actors Center in London and teaches dance at the Royal Central School of Speech and Drama (University of London), Mountview Academy of Theatre Arts (University of East Anglia) and the Italia Conti Academy of Theatre Arts (University of East London). He was the main dance coach in the "Kick boxer to Dancer" episode of the BAFTA-award-winning Faking It and he has coached and choreographed for world champions in showdance, salsa, ballroom dancing and Argentine tango including several of the professional dance teachers from British television's Strictly Come Dancing on which he has appeared.

Harris is a Fellow and Examiner of the United Kingdom Alliance of Professional Teachers of Dancing (UKA), as well as an Honorary member of the British Association of Teachers of Dancing (BATD). He also teaches internationally, particularly in South East Asia, where he has helped to develop dance in the Philippines, Indonesia and Thailand. In recognition of this work, Harris was made an Honorary Lifetime Member of the Philippine Professional Dance Teachers Association and he has appeared on as a guest dance expert on television in England and in Asia, to discuss choreography and dance styles as diverse as salsa, Argentine tango, Lindy Hop, West Coast Swing, historical dance and dancesport

He has adjudicated at many international dance championships, including the prestigious Blackpool Dance Festival and he is a licensed adjudicator with both the World DanceSport Federation and the World Dance Council

Salsa and Merengue – The Essential Step by Step Guide was written by Paul Harris and published in 1998. It is considered a definitive work of its kind in the dance industry and is the basis of the syllabi Harris has written in merengue, salsa and mambo, for the International Dance Teachers Association (IDTA), the British Association of Teachers of Dancing (BATD), the National Association of Teachers of Dancing (NATD) and the United Kingdom Alliance of Professional Teachers of Dancing (UKA). The book played a pivotal role in the history of salsa in the UK particularly in the formation of the (then) new Club Dance Division of the UKA. This development, for the first time, enabled teachers of salsa in Britain, to gain a recognised professional teaching qualification. In addition to this, Harris wrote the UKA's course guide for drama schools in 19th & 20th century social dance and co-founded their historical dance Faculty.

In 1996, Paul Harris founded London Theatre of Ballroom, during which they enjoyed a critically acclaimed six-month run at London's Café de Paris. They are dedicated to preserving and progressing ballroom dancing as performing art and their repertoire, choreographed entirely by Paul Harris, consists of shows based on swing dance, tango, Latin dancing, vintage dance and American smooth (Hollywood style partner dancing). They remain Britain's only ballroom based dance/theatre company.

Works

Television dramas and films

TV features, reality shows and appearances

Theatre

Commercials and music videos

Stage and trade shows

References

External links
 Official Website of Paul Harris
 

Alumni of the Academy of Live and Recorded Arts
English choreographers
Year of birth missing (living people)
Living people
People from St Helens, Merseyside
Film choreographers